"Jackie's Racing" is a song by Scottish rock band Whiteout, released in 1995 (see 1995 in music). It was the band's fourth single, released shortly before their first album, Bite It, on which the song is featured also. The B-sides "Cousin Jane" and "So Confused" reappeared on the Japanese EP Young Tribe Rule later the same year. Music journalist M.C. Strong writes that "Jackie's Racing" was the band's "... most successful release, displaying a healthy affection for 60's West Coast pop a la Lovin' Spoonful and The Mamas & the Papas." Strong also mentions that the B-Side "So Confused" "... [brings] to mind the harmonies of American Beauty-era Grateful Dead."

Track listing
CD and 12" vinyl:
"Jackie's Racing" – 3:21
"Cousin Jane" – 4:08
"So Confused" – 4:58

7" vinyl and cassette:
"Jackie's Racing" – 3:21
"Cousin Jane" – 4:08

All songs written by Carroll/Lindsay/Smith/Jones

Personnel
Andrew Caldwell – vocals
Eric Lindsay – guitar, backing vocals
Paul Carroll – bass, backing vocals
Stuart Smith – drums

Additional personnel
Phil Kane – Hammond organ, piano

Production
Production: Oransay Avenue and Kenny Paterson (track 1)
Production: Oransay Avenue and Sarah Bedingham (track 2)
Production: Oransay Avenue and Brian O'Shaughnessy (track 3)
Mix: Brian O'Shaughnessy
Assistant engineer: Alex Jones
Cover design: George Miller
Photography: Elaine Constantine

Chart positions

References

Whiteout (band) songs
1995 singles